The Tin Man is a 1935 American comedy short released by Metro-Goldwyn-Mayer, produced by Hal Roach and directed by James Parrott, and starring Thelma Todd and Patsy Kelly. It is the 15th entry in the series.

Cast
Thelma Todd as Thelma
Patsy Kelly as Patsy
Matthew Betz as The Criminal
Clarence Wilson as The Mad Scientist
Billy Bletcher as The Voice of The Robot

References

External links 
 

American comedy short films
1930s American films